Omari Jones (born November 7, 2002) is an American boxer. He competed at the 2021 AIBA World Boxing Championships, winning the silver medal in the welterweight division.

References

External links 

2002 births
Living people
Place of birth missing (living people)
American male boxers
Welterweight boxers
AIBA World Boxing Championships medalists